Dileep K Nair is an Indian educationist, skill development campaigner, social activist, and publisher. He is the first Chancellor of North East Frontier Technical University (NEFTU), in Aalo, Arunachal Pradesh, India, the youngest chancellor in India.

Positions held
 Chancellor- North East Frontier Technical University.
 Founder & Chairman – The Automobile Society of India.
 Founder & Chairman – The Engineers Outlook Magazine.

References

People from Malappuram district
1978 births
Living people
University of Calicut alumni